Malta competed in the Eurovision Song Contest 2002 in Tallinn, Estonia. The Maltese entry was selected through the Malta Song for Europe contest, where the winner was Ira Losco with the song "7th Wonder", written by Philip Vella and Gerard James Borg.

Before Eurovision

Malta Song for Europe 2002 
Public Broadcasting Services (PBS), the Maltese broadcaster, organised a national final to select the 2002 Maltese entry to the Eurovision Song Contest. Malta Song for Europe 2002 was held on 15 and 16 February, where the winner was decided through an expert jury, comprising 5/8 of the overall vote, and public televoting, comprising the remaining 3/8 of the vote.

Sixteen songs competed to be the Maltese entry to Eurovision, with the final winner being Ira Losco with the song "7th Wonder".

At Eurovision
At Eurovision Ira performed "7th Wonder" 20th in the running order, following Turkey and preceding Romania. Malta finished the night with 164 points (maximum 12s from Croatia, Denmark and the United Kingdom) finishing 2nd of the 24 entries, Malta's best placing to date, with only Romania failing to award the song any points. The Maltese votes were calculated through a 50/50 split in public televote held after all songs had performed and the votes of a professional jury. However this would be the last year that countries could choose the use a 50/50 voting method after allegations of vote swapping were used between the eight countries (including Malta) that used juries for part or all of their votes.

Voting

References

External links
Maltese National Final 2002

2002
Countries in the Eurovision Song Contest 2002
Eurovision